Charles Handfield Jones (1818–1890) was an English physician.

Life
The son of Captain Jones, R.N., he was born in Liverpool, 1 October 1818. He was one of Thomas Arnold's pupils at Rugby School, went on to Catharine Hall, Cambridge in 1837, and graduated B.A. in 1840. After study at St. George's Hospital, London, he took the degree of M.B. at Cambridge in 1843, but never proceeded to that of M.D.

Jones became a member of the College of Physicians of London in 1845, and was elected a fellow in 1849. He published a paper of observations on the minute structure of the liver, which led to his election as fellow of the Royal Society in 1850. In 1851 he was elected physician to St. Mary's Hospital, Paddington, and continued on the staff of there till his death.

Jones attained a reputation as a histologist and as a clinical observer. In the College of Physicians he was junior censor in 1863–4 and senior censor in 1886, and in 1888 a vice-president. In 1865 he delivered the Lumleian lectures on the pathology of the nervous system.

Resident in Green Street, Park Lane, Jones in later years, moved to Montagu Square, London. He died there of cancer of the stomach, 30 September 1890.

Works
Jones published with Edward Henry Sieveking, in 1854, a Manual of Pathological Anatomy, and in 1864 Clinical Observations on Functional Nervous Disorders. He wrote also papers in medical journals, the Transactions of the Medico-Chirurgical Society of London, and the Transactions of the Pathological Society.

Family
Jones married in 1851 Louisa Holt, and had two sons, who both went into the medical profession.

Notes

Attribution

1819 births
1890 deaths
19th-century English medical doctors
Fellows of the Royal Society
Medical doctors from Liverpool
People educated at Rugby School
Alumni of St Catharine's College, Cambridge
Deaths from stomach cancer
Deaths from cancer in England
Histologists